Ninu Veedani Needanu Nene is a 2019 Indian Telugu romantic thriller film written and directed by Caarthick Raju and produced by Dayapannem and Vijisubramanian, under the banner of Venkatadari Talkies. The film stars Sundeep Kishan, Anya Singh, Vennela Kishore, Pragathi, and Murali Sharma in the lead roles.
The film was simultaneously shot in Tamil titled Kannaadi; however, the Tamil version remains unreleased. The music of the film is composed by S. Thaman and was theatrically released on 12 July 2019.

Cast

 Sundeep Kishan as Arjun
 Anya Singh as Madhavi
 Vennela Kishore as Rishi
 Murali Sharma as Tharun
 Poornima Bhagyaraj as Arjun's mother
 Pragathi as Rishi's mother
 Posani Krishna Murali as Cop
 Jeeva Ravi as Arjun's father
 Kumaravel as Subha Reddy
 S. N. Surendar as Church father
 Sivasankar as Priest 
 Kayal Devaraj as Priest 
 Malavika Nair and Karthick Naren  as Psychology students (cameo appearance)

Soundtrack

The music of the film is composed by S. Thaman, and released by Think Music India.

Release 
The film was released on 12 July 2019. The Hindi dubbed version titled Main Hoon Sarfira Jigrawala was directly premiered on Sony Max TV channel on 19 September 2022.

Reception 
A critic from The Hindu wrote that "This isn’t the smartest film in the horror space, but it tries to bring in something new. If only the taut first half was followed by an equally gripping latter half". A critic from The Times of India wrote that "Ninu Veedani Needanu Nene is promising in parts with entertaining moments but loses steam when it matters the most".

See also 
List of Telugu films of 2019

References

External links
 
 

2010s Telugu-language films
2019 films
2019 thriller drama films
Indian multilingual films
Indian thriller drama films
Films directed by Caarthick Raju